The Strathmore meteorite landed in the Strathmore area of Perthshire on 3 December 1917. It was reported to have been in four fragments, subsequently named Essendy, Carsie, Keithick and South Corston. The meteorite is estimated to be 4.5 billion years old.

The South Corston fragment of the meteorite is in the care of Perth Museum and Art Gallery.

See also

 Glossary of meteoritics
 Meteorite find

References

Meteorites found in the United Kingdom
1917 in science
1917 in Scotland
Geography of Perth, Scotland